Parliamentary elections were held in Chile on 11 December 1997. The Concert of Parties for Democracy alliance maintained its majority in both the Chamber of Deputies and the Senate.

Results

Senate

Chamber of Deputies

References

Elections in Chile
1997 in Chile
1997 elections in Chile
Chile
Presidency of Eduardo Frei Ruiz-Tagle